Podlasie Governorate was an administrative unit (a governorate) of the Kingdom of Poland. 

It was created in 1837 from the Podlasie Voivodeship; its capital was in Siedlce. In 1844 it was merged into a larger Lublin Governorate; in 1867 it was recreated as the Siedlce Governorate.

References
Geographical Dictionary of the Kingdom of Poland

Governorates of Congress Poland
States and territories established in 1837
History of Lesser Poland